Dan Costa may refer to:

 Dan Costa (journalist), editor-in-chief of PC Magazine
 Dan Costa (composer) (born 1989), jazz pianist and composer